For the 8th Dragoons in the British Army, see 8th King's Royal Irish Hussars.

The 8th Dragoon Regiment (8e régiment de dragons or 8e RD) was a cavalry regiment in the French Army created under the Ancien Régime in 1674 by the Marquis of Heudicourt.

History 
Original article in French:

Under the Ancien Règime 
In 1674, a new regiment was created by the Marquis of Heudicourt, named the Heudicourt Regiment. It was renamed multiple times under the command of the Ancien Règime:

• Choiseul-Praslin Regiment (1688)

• Toulouse Regiment (1693)

• Penthievre Regiment (1737), later also "Penthievre Regiment Dragoons"(1776)

This regiment would initially first serve in the Dutch Wars, and the Siege of Luxembourg, playing minor roles. They would enter combat at numerous points in the War of the League of Augsburg, the Battle of Neerwinden, the early bombardment of Brussels, and the War of the Spanish Succession, proving effective in most of these encounters. Following more Succession crisis in Europe, with the Penthievre Regiment serving in most of these wars, (War of the Spanish Succession, War of the Polish Succession, War of the Austrian Succession) the Penthievre Regiment lost its commander in the Seven Years War, and took no further action in following events.

Revolutionary Wars 
In the Revolutionary Wars, the Penthievre Regiment was renamed, the 8th Dragoon Regiment. Moving from Army of the Alps to Army of the Rhine, they took part in multiple probing attacks on Coalition Forces at Mainz, and Wissembourg. Then, moved to the Army of the Moselle. In the Army of Italy, they took part in the Siege of Mantua, and the Battle of Rivoli.

After serving for more years on the Rhine (1799), in 1800, this Regiment was one of three regiments that participated in the coup of 18' Brumaire, and won distinction in the Battle of Marengo.

Napoleonic Wars 
The 8th Dragoons were part of the occupation force in Naples and were sent to the coast for the 'Invasion' of Britain. But in 1805, they joined the Grand Armèè, participating in their early victories at Austerlitz and Jena. They were devastated at Elyau like most cavalry units and missed the Battle of Friedland.

From 1808 to 1811, the 8th Dragoons would operate entirely in the Iberian Peninsula in the Peninsular Wars. Summoned to modern day Germany in 1813, they took part in the Battle of Leipzig, in which they would be defeated. They will not take further action in the defense of France.

Following Napoleon's return from exile, the 8th Dragoons once again joined the Grande Armèè, becoming part of I Corp. Missing the Battle of Ligny, the 8th Dragoons would play a role in the Battle of Waterloo, also defeated.

1815 - 1914

Bourbon Restoration 
Following Napoleon's defeat, the 8th Dragoon Regiment was reduced to just a garrison. 1823 saw it active in Spain, and from 1825, they would be stationed at Nevers. They will not be affected by the changes in leadership, with the Bourbons overthrown, following two more republics.

Franco-Prussian War 
In the Franco-Prussian War, the 8th Dragoons would be highly active, following their reinstatement as a regiment, serving in the Battles of Borny and Gravelotte. They were part of the force that tried to relieve forces participating in the siege in Metz along with the Army of the Rhine. It would be followed by skirmishes in Lorcy. Following an uprising in Paris by the French Communes, the 8th Dragoons were put under the command of the Army of Versailles, participating in the Bloody Week, acts of reprisal against the rebellion.

Before 1914 
After the end of the Franco-Prussian War, the 8th Dragoons were at patrol in Luneville, starting from 1877. They would take no military actions as they were on garrison duty.

World War I 
After World War I began, the 8th Dragoons were sent to the frontline trenches. They later participated in the Battle of the Marne, and after 3 years in the trenches, the Germans tried desperately to break the stalemate. The 8th Dragoons were part of the counter offensive in 1918, first arriving at Amiens, then to the mountainous terrain of Southern Flanders, and by the end of the attack, were at Aisne.

Peacetime 
During peacetime, the 8th Dragoons were quartered at Luneville.

World War II

1939 
The 8th Dragoon Regiment, together with 31st Dragoons, form the 4th Cavalry Brigade, itself the first part of the 2nd Cavalry Division. The 2nd Cavalry Division would station themselves in the Ardennes to delay the Germans for as long as possible, in front of the 9th Army.

1940 
When the German attack began on May 10, 1940, the 8th Dragoons were made up of four squadrons, with the capacity of 900 men, and 1,200 horses in total. Half of the men would become prisoners of war while a small contingent was withdrawn. Nevertheless, the 8th Dragoons fought with the British Expeditionary Force in Belgium and France, delaying the Germans while the main group made its escape. By the time the remaining Allied units at the Dunkirk Pocket surrendered, the 8th Dragoons virtually ceased to exist.

1941 
The 8th Dragoons were recreated by the Vichy Government under the command of the Armistice Army (Vichy Army), one of the fewest units chosen.

1942 
The 8th Dragoons were disbanded once again after the Germans invaded Vichy France, bringing an end to the German puppet state.

1944 
After the liberation of France, the 8th Dragoons were recreated, merged with the 1st Spahi Regiment, battering German forces in Alsace and in Germany until German surrender in May. By that time the 8th Dragoons were stationed at Lake Constance, and were awarded the Croix de Guerre.

1945 to present 
Following World War II, the 8th Dragoons garrisoned the City of Poitiers, then was sent in 1952 to Saarburg, shortly becoming part of the French occupation force in Germany. In 1956, the 8th Dragoons would participate in their last military operation in the Suez Canal, following the Suez Crisis. In 1964, the 8th Dragoons joined the 4th Hussar Regiment, and were stationed in Morhange Barracks where they would be dissolved in 1977.

Garrisons 
Abbeville (1869)
Meaux (1887- 1893)
Lunèville (1894- 1914)
Vitry le François (1914)
Lunèville (1919- 1942) *Remnants were kept there until the Germans get to disarm them*
Alace and Germany (1944- 1946) *Oppose German forces as they were pushed back farther into Germany
Poitiers (1946- 1952)
Saarburg (1952- 1964)
Morhange (1964- 1977)

Marquis de camp, regimental colonels, commanders, and lieutenant colonels

Old Regimè/Ancien 
Title: Marquis de Camp
Michel Sublet Marquis d'Heudicourt (1674)
Jean Baptiste Gaston de Choiseul, Count of Hostel and marquis de Praslin (1688)
 Count of Souternon (1693)
Count of Gacè  (1702)
Count d'Agenois (1706)
Marquis d'Estournel (1714)
Marquis d'Hautefort d'Ajat (1734)
Marquis de Crenay, Count of Montaigu (1736)
Viscount of Castellane-Novèjean (1748)
Count of Saluces (1753)
Michel Louis Marie marquis de Beuzeville (1770)
Conrad-Adolphe-Louis de Lardenois de Ville (1773)
Jean Baptiste Gaston de Choiseul (1779)
Jean, comte du Authier (1788- 1790)

Officers of the Revolutionary Army 
Colonel Generals:
François Bouzet de Montjoye (1791)
Jean Thomas Scelles  (1792)
Charles Hubert (1793)
Jean Louis Falque (1794)
Jacques Louis François Milet (1797)
Louis Jean Nicolas Abbot (1798)

Napoleonic officers 
Louis Beckler (1800- 1806) 
Alexandre Louis Robert (1806- 1811)
Alexandre Lebrun (1811)
Charles Joseph Hatry (1813)
Eugène-Gabriel (1814)
Charles François Martigue (1815)

Bourbon Restorationists 
Pierre-Jacques (1823) 
Jean-Alexandre Le Pays de Bourjolly (1835- 1839)

French Republicans 
Colonels:
Xavier de Lagoutte (1865- 1869)

World War I 
Louis Conneau (1907) *Temporary command*

World War II 
Léon Cuny (1939- 1940)
Commander Kuntz (5/15/1940- 5/26/1940)*Regiment formally disbanded*

Vichy France 
Olleris (1940- 1941) *Regiment reformed as part of Vichy Army. Disbanded again once Vichy France collapsed*

1945- 1977 
Simon Y. (1955)
Paramelle (1963)
Mercier (1964)
Colomb (1966)
Perier (1968)
Delmotte (1970)
Perrey (1972)
Mialet (1974)
Lieutenant Colonel Georges Delclève (1976- 1977) *Regiment dismissed from service*

Notable personnel from the regiment 

 Antoine Remy, a Knight and Baron of the 1st French Empire. Later allied to Louis XVIII. (Joined in 1783)
 Louis Jean Nicolas Abbot, a Major General of the Empire, and was Captain of the 8th Dragoon Regiment in 1798.
 Charles-Marie de Mac Mahon, second Lieutenant of the 8th Dragoons, heir to the Mac Mahon family. (Joined in 1877)
 Yves Guellec, a brigadier in the 8th Dragoons, soon made his name famous in World War II. (Joined in 1932)
 Bernard Chevignard, awarded the Companion of the Liberation decoration for his service in World War II. (Joined in 1933)

Traditions and uniforms

Standards

Old Regimè

1945- present 
The modern standard of the 8th Dragoons have the following words sewed into it.
Rivoli 1797
Marengo 1800
Austerlitz 1805
Heilsburg 1807
La Mortagne 1914
Flanders 1918
L'Aisne 1918

Decorations

Badges/heraldry 
In 1953, the official Regimental badge of the 8th Dragoon Regiment was a shield from the Ancien Règime with the Coat of Arms of the Bourbon Penthievre family, of which the regiment was first named after, placed on an anchor. Above will be a Flory Crown, and below will spell in English, Dragon- Penthievre. The badge can be seen at the start of this page.

The tie of the honor awards are decorated:

Motto 
"Which rubs against the pricks itself." -1972

"And of the land and sea." -1977–present motto

Notes

References

Military units and formations disestablished in 1977
1674 establishments in France
Dragoon regiments of France